The 2018–19 season was Carlisle United's 114th season in their history and their fifth consecutive season in League Two. Along with League Two, the club participated in the FA Cup, EFL Cup and EFL Trophy.

The season covered the period from 1 July 2018 to 30 June 2019.

Squad statistics

|}

Top scorers

Disciplinary record

Notes:

Competitions

Pre-season friendlies
The Cumbrians confirmed friendlies against Barrow, Penrith, Kendal Town, AFC Fylde, Workington and Bradford City.

League Two

League table

Results summary

Results by matchday

Matches
On 21 June 2018, the League Two fixtures for the forthcoming season were announced.

Notes:
 Carlisle's away match was postponed due to Crewe Alexandra's home ground, Gresty Road pitch was frozen.

FA Cup

The first round draw was made live on BBC by Dennis Wise and Dion Dublin on 22 October. The draw for the second round was made live on BBC and BT by Mark Schwarzer and Glenn Murray on 12 November.

EFL Cup

On 15 June 2018, the draw for the first round was made in Vietnam.

EFL Trophy

On 13 July 2018, the initial group stage draw bar the U21 invited clubs was announced.

Group stages standings

Group stages results

Transfers

Transfers in

Transfers out

Loans in

Loans out

References

Carlisle United F.C. seasons
Carlisle United